Gary Brewer and the Kentucky Ramblers are a family band with roots dating back six generations. Gary Brewer and his 2 sons accompanied by banjo perform their unique sound called "Brewgrass". 'Brewgrass' is a fusion of multiple American-roots style music. Having performed in all 50 US States, and throughout Canada & Europe since 1980.

The group celebrated its 40th Anniversary in 2020 releasing album "40th Anniversary Celebration" during the COVID-19 pandemic. The release garnered the group great success and multiple write ups in well known publications including an article by Saving Country Music entitled "Giving Thanks That Bluegrass Is BACK!" saying "Gary Brewer and the Kentucky Ramblers, who even in the current environment of new bluegrass stars has been one of the best-selling bluegrass acts in the last couple of years". 40th Anniversary Celebration spent 16 weeks at #1 and 72 weeks in the top 5 on the Billboard Bluegrass Albums chart. It was also included on the Billboard 2021 all-genre ‘Top Current Albums Sales’ year-end chart between mainstream artists Rob Zombie and Ariana Grande.

According to Medium, the band was later submitted to the 64th Grammy Awards initial round for “Best New Artist” (recognizing the band's 40-year career, its second wind of new life with new generations of Brewers, and their largest mainstream breakthrough success to date.)

Following their 2020 release, GBKR collaborated with Americana singer-songwriter Jim Lauderdale for the single "Pass Along The Good" (co-written by Gary Brewer and Jim Lauderdale). Initially premiered by Glide Magazine quoted saying "The results of this collaboration are composed of some of the most vital Americana ingredients out there, where top-shelf songwriting meets sublime musical instrumentation." Pass Along The Good was released in late January 2022 and was number 1 on the Global Radio Indicator Americana/Grassicana chart as the top downloaded/played track of the entire month of January 2022. It also received heavy rotation on Sirius XM’s Outlaw Country (ch 60). Critical praise was given by multiple publications including: SkopeMag, VENTS Magazine, Grateful Web, and more.

Members & Roles 
Gary Brewer – Lead Acoustic Guitar/Old-time Banjo/Electric Guitar/Vocals

Wayne Brewer – Upright bass/Fiddle/Electric Guitar/Vocals

Mason Brewer – Mandolin/Upright Bass/Percussion/Vocals

Cody Pearman – Banjo

SGM Records 
SGM Records was founded by Gary Brewer in 1988 as an independent record label. At first, the label was used to re-release Brewer's back catalog, but he later decided to take advantage of his 100% creative control and release new recordings as well. Gary's oldest son Wayne Brewer became CEO of SGM in 2012; later followed by his wife becoming COO in 2015. Since SGM's launch, Gary Brewer and the Kentucky Ramblers have been the main focus (releasing 29 studio albums), but individual solo projects by the Ramblers & family are also on SGM (Gary's grandfather Finley J. “Pap” Brewer Sr. who played with the original Carter Family in the 1920s, Gary's father Finley J. Brewer Jr.’s “Truck Driving Man”, Wayne Brewer's “The Kentucky Fiddler”, and Gary's youngest son Mason Brewer's “Monstrous Shadows”). Genres and artists outside of Bluegrass are included on the label with more to be added.

Global Distribution Deal 
In April 2022, Gary Brewer and the Kentucky Ramblers signed with Bob Frank Entertainment (BFE) for global distribution through The Orchard; teaming up with SGM Records for GBKR's back catalog and future releases.

Launched in 2012, BFE has offices in New York and Nashville. They offer a variety of client services including distribution, music publishing, management consulting, and film and television production to both labels and artists. 

The Orchard is a full service distribution firm with offices in 45 major cities worldwide. They specialize in offering their clients digital and physical sales and marketing, advertising, sync and brand partnerships, rights management, video monetization, collaborator splits and royalty accounting, and publishing administration, according to Bluegrass Today.

Brewgrass Entertainment Studio 
 Located in the SGM Records warehouse near the Louisville, KY area, the Brewgrass Entertainment Studio was built in 2020 by Gary Brewer and his sons. Gary collected vintage microphones throughout his career, with this studio being his lifelong dream. His collection of Neumann, Shure, Telefunken, and RCA gear was added to the studio with a Steven Slate Audio Raven Multi-Touch-Screen Production Console running Pro Tools at the heart of the system. They also installed custom built-in racks for their new/vintage processing equipment, which includes Universal Audio Apollo X8P interfaces, preamps, EQ, among them. The studio is primarily for private use, but others are able to record by invitation only.

Event Production

Friday Night Bluegrass Concert Series 
After many different hosts had let the show go down, Gary Brewer and the Kentucky Ramblers took over hosting the Friday Night Bluegrass concert series back in 2014. Located in Shepherdsville, KY, with local, national, and regional acts each week. Gary Brewer's goal was to give the people of Kentucky a show barn to attend for Live Bluegrass music. He wanted to give them the full experience while performing each show themselves and featuring a guest band as well. An annual occurrence, the shows run from November to April.

Bluegrass Summer Nights Concert Series 
In addition to hosting a winter concert series, Gary Brewer and the Kentucky Ramblers connected with the Outlet Shoppes of the Bluegrass and created a summer concert series called Bluegrass Summer Nights. Free concerts are offered during the summer months for shoppers. Just like the Friday Night Bluegrass show, Gary Brewer has local, national, and regional touring bands as guests on the Bluegrass Summer Nights lineup.

Shin-dig in the Park Music Festival 
Among producing other events, Gary Brewer and the Kentucky Ramblers host a bi-annual music festival called Shin-dig in the Park. It's located in Shepherdsville, KY at the Shepherdsville City Park. The music festival takes place in Spring and Fall, and the lineup includes artists of multiple genres (Bluegrass, Country, Americana, Rock, Gospel, and more). It is a free community event.

Brewgrass Entertainment (Music Venue) 
Due to the success of their Winter and Summer concert series, Gary Brewer and the Kentucky Ramblers partnered with the Outlet Shoppes of the Bluegrass transforming a former retail space into a live music venue inside of Kentucky's largest outlet mall (Brewgrass Entertainment). Running from November 2019 – April 2020, as an artist residency; and it acted as the official kick-off to Gary Brewer and the Kentucky Ramblers 40th Anniversary celebration tour. Keeping live music in their home state of Kentucky is important to them for now and future generations. Brewgrass Entertainment (Music Venue): an intimate style venue offering guest groups from various genres (Bluegrass, Country, Americana, Gospel, and more).

Deep Roots Music Fest 
Gary Brewer & the Kentucky Ramblers and their production company, Brewgrass Entertainment partnered with the City of Louisville (KY), Louisville Parks and Recreation, & the Iroquois Amphitheater for a free community event. Deep Roots Music Fest featured former Foreigner lead singer Johnny Edwards, America's Got Talent Season 11 finalists Linkin Bridge, and special guest CJ Sparks. Gary Brewer & the Kentucky Ramblers headlined the event. The goal of the event was to bring healing to the community through their mutual love of various music and diversity in Louisville. Deep Roots Music Fest took place on Saturday, June 18, 2022 at the Iroquois Amphitheater.

Album Release Highlights

"Vintage Country Revival" CD (2018) 
Gary Brewer is a bluegrass artist who released an acoustic Country album including 13 tracks of some of the top classic Country hits (all performed by Gary Brewer and the Kentucky Ramblers). Among Bye Bye Love, Good Hearted Woman, T For Texas, Oh Lonesome Me, and various others, John Prine's Paradise is performed as a duet by Gary and teen country prodigy, EmiSunshine. "Vintage Country Revival" was entered on the initial Grammy Awards ballot for Best Americana Album and Best American-Roots Performance.

"40th Anniversary Celebration" CD (2020) 
Being in the music business and on the road for 40 years, Gary Brewer has written and recorded a lot of material. He decided to release an album with some of his greatest hits with a new twist and his current band. "40th Anniversary Celebration" has 14 tracks and features guests on nearly all of them. Including: Sam Bush, The Travelin' McCourys, Russell Moore, Dale Ann Bradley, Doug Phelps (of the Kentucky Headhunters), T. Graham Brown, Ashton Shepherd, and Ralph Stanley II.

The lead single "Goin' Up Shell Creek" received quite a bit of praise with its release prior to the full album. It was premiered by notable publication, American Songwriter, on March 23, 2020. Since its premiere, "Goin' Up Shell Creek" topped the APD Global Radio Charts for nearly a month, and has been played many times on Sirius XM station, Bluegrass Junction. Two of the other tracks were also premiered by notable publications. Track number 13, "Big Train" (featuring Doug Phelps of Grammy-winning band, the Kentucky Headhunters), was premiered in Vents Magazine on May 22, 2020 to offer an exclusive preview of the rest of the record. "Big Train" also received airplay on Sirius XM station Bluegrass Junction. Track number 3, "Daddy and the Old Oak Tree", was premiered by The Bluegrass Situation on May 27, 2020.

#1 on Billboard Bluegrass Albums Chart  
 Soon after the release of "40th Anniversary Celebration", it received the #1 spot on the Billboard Bluegrass Albums Chart. This milestone marked the first time in his career Gary Brewer and the Kentucky Ramblers topped this chart.

Proclamations and Dedications

Gary Brewer Day (Shepherdsville, KY) 
In recognition of his 40th Anniversary and the success of the "40th Anniversary Celebration" CD, Monday, October 26, 2020 was declared 'Gary Brewer Day' by Mayor Curtis Hockenbury and the City of Shepherdsville.

'Gary Brewer & the Kentucky Ramblers Pavilion' Dedication 
The City of Shepherdsville and Mayor Hockenbury dedicated the Shepherdsville City Park/Frank E. Simon Pavilion to Gary Brewer & the Kentucky Ramblers on October 10, 2021 during their 2021 Fall Shin-dig in the Park Music Festival.

GBKR honored by City of Louisville (KY) 
On October 16, 2021, Mayor Greg Fischer held a press conference with an official proclamation to congratulate Gary Brewer & the Kentucky Ramblers on their 40th Anniversary and their recent album's success. The Mayor had been aware of the group and Brewgrass Entertainment, but they captured his attention at their September 2021 Waterfront Wednesday show where they captivated a 20,000+ crowd with their variety show performance.

References 

American bluegrass music groups
Musical groups from Kentucky